The Redwater River is a tributary of the Missouri River, approximately 110 mi (177 km), in eastern Montana in the United States.

It rises in on the northern slope of the Big Sheep Mountains, in northwestern Prairie County, and flows northeast across the plains past Brockway and Circle and joins the Missouri in northeastern McCone County, approximately 4 mi (6 km) south of Poplar.

Variant names
The Redwater River has also been known as: Red Water Creek, Red Water River, Redwater Creek, Two Thousand Mile Creek, Two-Thousand-Mile Creek

See also

List of rivers of Montana
Montana Stream Access Law

Notes

Rivers of Montana
Tributaries of the Missouri River
Bodies of water of McCone County, Montana
Bodies of water of Dawson County, Montana
Bodies of water of Prairie County, Montana
Bodies of water of Richland County, Montana